Te Whanganui / Port Underwood is a sheltered harbour which forms the north-east extension of Te Koko-o-Kupe / Cloudy Bay at the northeast of New Zealand's South Island, on the east coast of the Marlborough Sounds. With only a relatively narrow entrance to the south-south-east it is sheltered from almost all winds. Originally considered part of Cloudy Bay, the port was named after Joseph Underwood of the shipping firm Kabel and Underwood in the early 19th century.

There is evidence of a large Māori population at various times prior to European arrival in New Zealand. In the 1820s the local Rangitane were defeated by the Ngāti Toa chief Te Rauparaha. Sealers first visited about 1826 and were followed immediately by whalers. John Guard, who had started a whaling station in Tory Channel the previous year, set up a subsidiary station at Kakapo Bay in 1828. By 1840 there were approximately 150 Europeans in the area, probably the largest concentration in the South Island at that time. Large numbers of southern right whales and humpback whales were hunted in the bay, resulting in destroying these populations and rarities of their sightings in the bay nowadays.

On 16 June HMS Herald arrived with Major Thomas Banbury on board bringing the Treaty of Waitangi for the South Island chiefs to sign. This took place on Horahora-Kakahu Island just offshore from the eastern shoreline. The only European to sign the Treaty as one of the cedants, Joseph Thomas, son-in-law of Te Rauparaha's elder brother Nohorua, signed on 16 June. Nouhora himself, initially reluctant to sign, did so the following day. A commemorative bronze plaque marking the occasion was unveiled here on 3 October 1964.

The name of the harbour was officially altered to Te Whanganui / Port Underwood in August 2014.

Notable people
Ann Boyce, pioneer and herbalist.
John Jacky Guard (1790/92–1858), landed in Kakapo Bay and was one of the first people to have a non Maori child in the South Island

References 

Geography of the Marlborough Region
Populated places in the Marlborough Region
Ports and harbours of New Zealand
Marlborough Sounds
Whaling stations in New Zealand
Populated places in the Marlborough Sounds